The William Watkins House, also known as the Sugar Bend Farm, is a historic house in Mount Pleasant, Tennessee, USA.

History
The house was built in the early 1830s for William Watkins, a Virginia native. It was designed in the Federal architectural style. Watkins was the owner of six African slaves in 1836. At the outbreak of the American Civil War in 1861, he was "one of the largest slaveholders in Maury County."

It has been listed on the National Register of Historic Places since October 13, 1986.

References

Houses on the National Register of Historic Places in Tennessee
Federal architecture in Tennessee
Houses completed in 1830
Houses in Maury County, Tennessee
National Register of Historic Places in Maury County, Tennessee